Heather Clark is a South African surfer.  At the end of 2003, she was ranked 3rd among female surfers in the world.
In 2009, she was seriously injured when the car in which she was traveling was struck by a drunk driver.
Competing at the International Surfing Association World Masters Surfing Championship, in 2010 she won her 2nd consecutive gold medal, and in 2011 she won the silver medal.

See also
7 Girls

References

External links
 ISA medalist listings

South African female surfers
Living people
Year of birth missing (living people)